A weight function is a mathematical device used when performing a sum, integral, or average to give some elements more "weight" or influence on the result than other elements in the same set. The result of this application of a weight function is a weighted sum or weighted average. Weight functions occur frequently in statistics and analysis, and are closely related to the concept of a measure.  Weight functions can be employed in both discrete and continuous settings. They can be used to construct systems of calculus called "weighted calculus" and "meta-calculus".

Discrete weights

General definition 
In the discrete setting, a weight function  is a positive function defined on a discrete set , which is typically finite or countable.  The weight function  corresponds to the unweighted situation in which all elements have equal weight.  One can then apply this weight to various concepts.

but given a weight function , the weighted sum or conical combination is defined as

One common application of weighted sums arises in numerical integration.

If B is a finite subset of A, one can replace the unweighted cardinality |B| of B by the weighted cardinality 

If A is a finite non-empty set, one can replace the unweighted mean or average 

by the weighted mean or weighted average 

In this case only the relative weights are relevant.

Statistics 
Weighted means are commonly used in statistics to compensate for the presence of bias.  For a quantity  measured multiple independent times  with variance , the best estimate of the signal is obtained  by averaging all the measurements with weight  and the resulting variance is smaller than each of the independent measurements  The maximum likelihood method weights the difference between fit and data using the same weights 

The expected value of a random variable is the weighted average of the possible values it might take on, with the weights being the respective probabilities. More generally, the expected value of a function of a random variable is the probability-weighted average of the values the function takes on for each possible value of the random variable.

In regressions in which the dependent variable is assumed to be affected by both current and lagged (past) values of the independent variable, a distributed lag function is estimated, this function being a weighted average of the current and various lagged independent variable values. Similarly, a moving average model specifies an evolving variable as a weighted average of current and various lagged values of a random variable.

Mechanics 
The terminology weight function arises from mechanics: if one has a collection of  objects on a lever, with weights  (where weight is now interpreted in the physical sense) and locations  then the lever will be in balance if the fulcrum of the lever is at the center of mass 

which is also the weighted average of the positions

Continuous weights 
In this context, the weight function  is sometimes referred to as a density.

General definition 
If  is a real-valued function, then the unweighted integral

can be generalized to the weighted integral 

Note that one may need to require  to be absolutely integrable with respect to the weight  in order for this integral to be finite.

Weighted volume 

Weighted average 
If  has finite non-zero weighted volume, then we can replace the unweighted average 

by the weighted average

Bilinear form 

to a weighted bilinear form 

See the entry on orthogonal polynomials for examples of weighted orthogonal functions.

See also 
 Center of mass
 Numerical integration
 Orthogonality
 Weighted mean
 Linear combination
 Kernel (statistics)
 Measure (mathematics)
 Riemann–Stieltjes integral
 Weighting
 Window function

References

Mathematical analysis
Measure theory
Combinatorial optimization
Functional analysis
Types of functions